The Defense Clandestine Service (DCS) is an arm of the Defense Intelligence Agency (DIA), which conducts clandestine espionage, intelligence gathering activities and classified operations around the world to provide insights and answer national-level defense objectives for senior U.S. policymakers and American military leaders. Staffed by civilian and military personnel, DCS is part of DIA's Directorate of Operations and works in conjunction with the Central Intelligence Agency's Directorate of Operations and the U.S. military's Joint Special Operations Command. DCS consists of about 500 clandestine operatives, which is roughly how many case officers the CIA maintained in the early 2000s prior to its expansion.

Contrary to some public and media misunderstanding, DCS is not a "new" intelligence agency but rather a consolidation, expansion and realignment of existing Defense HUMINT activities, which have been carried out by DIA for decades under various names, most recently as the Defense Human Intelligence Service.

History
In 2012, the Pentagon announced its intention to ramp up spying operations against high-priority targets, such as Iran, under an intelligence reorganization aimed at expanding the military's espionage efforts beyond war zones. To this end, the DIA consolidated its existing human intelligence capabilities into the Defense Clandestine Service, with plans to work closely with the CIA and the Joint Special Operations Command.

The Defense Clandestine Service consolidated several of the DIA’s military-intelligence elements, including the Defense Human Intelligence and Counterterrorism Center, the Counterintelligence Field Activity, the Strategic Support Branch, and the Defense Attaché System. This has created an internal intelligence network within the US military so powerful that some officials have described it as a second CIA.

The plan was developed in response to a classified study completed in 2011 by the Director of National Intelligence, which concluded that the military's espionage efforts needed to be more focused on major targets beyond the tactical considerations of Iraq and Afghanistan. While in the past, DIA was effectively conducting its traditional, and much larger, mission of providing intelligence to troops and commanders in war zones, the study noted it needed to focus more attention outside the battlefields on "national intelligence"—gathering and distributing information on global issues and sharing that intelligence with other agencies. The realignment was expected to affect several hundred operatives who already worked in intelligence assignments abroad, mostly as case officers for the DIA, which serves as the Pentagon's main source of human intelligence and analysis. The new service was expected to grow by several hundred operatives and was intended to complement the espionage network of the CIA, which focuses on a wider array of non-military threats.

The original Defense Clandestine Service, an outgrowth of the Monarch Eagle concept, was created and implemented in 1984. It was backed by Senators Barry Goldwater and Jesse Helms, with the support of Chairman of the Joint Chiefs General John Vessey, Assistant Secretary of the Army for Manpower & Reserve Affairs (M&RA) William D. Clark, and Deputy Assistant Secretary of Defense for Intelligence Frank Aurilio. It consolidated the clandestine intelligence programs of each of the military services into a single DOD program, thus eliminating duplication of effort, and importantly, to provide a promotion path for case officers to achieve flag rank. The Goldwater–Nichols Act was specifically designed to support this objective as service at the DOD level would count toward the joint service requirement to achieve flag rank. The objective of the DOD Clandestine Service was to target intelligence gaps in countries regarded as potential adversaries or sites of activities requiring a military response; these gaps had gone unaddressed under CIA priorities. DOD case officers are carefully selected and trained; most have advanced degrees, speak multiple languages, and are area experts. The Senate Select Committee on Intelligence praised the program for its exceptional productivity. By the mid-1990s, the program had been undercut by President Clinton's directors of Central Intelligence, who preferred to be in full control of all espionage operations.

Seal specifications and symbolism

The seal of the Defense Clandestine Service consists of a black disc, rimmed in red. There is an American bald eagle with its wings displayed and inverted. The eagle is perched upon a shield. The shield is argent with six pallets of gules. The shield has a chief of azure with thirteen mullets of the first. Below the shield, there is a wreath of laurel and olive. In an arch above the eagle, there is the inscription "Defense Clandestine Service" in yellow capital letters. In an arch below the wreath, there is the inscription "Defense Intelligence Agency" in yellow capital letters.

The eagle and shield are prominent symbols of the Department of Defense. The perch and sharp eye of the eagle denote the Defense Clandestine Service's ability to plan, coordinate, and execute worldwide missions. Here the eagle looks to its left side, illustrating the Service's competence to meet national level defense intelligence requirements. The wings slightly cloak the shield, alluding to clandestine and overt operations. The wreath of laurel and olive honors the teamwork among Defense Intelligence Agency clandestine service members, in concert with the Central Intelligence Agency, the Federal Bureau of Investigation, and Combatant Commands. The black disc underscores the worldwide clandestine operations of the Defense Clandestine Service.

In Popular Culture
The Brave (TV series) is an American military action drama series about the DIA's Defense Clandestine Service (DCS). 

Gemini Man (film) is a 2019 American science fiction action thriller film directed by Ang Lee about DSC.

See also
Directorate of Operations (CIA)

References

Defense Intelligence Agency
Government agencies established in 2012
2012 establishments in the United States